Hauge Lutheran Church may refer to:
The Hauge Synod of the Lutheran church
Hauge Lutheran Church (Goodhue County, Minnesota)
Hauge Lutheran Church (Norway, Illinois)
Hauge Log Church, a Lutheran church in Daleyville, Wisconsin